La Aurora International Airport serves Guatemala City, Guatemala. It is administered by the Dirección General de Aeronáutica Civil.

La Aurora International Airport is the primary airport of Guatemala. The airport went through a massive modernization and expansion. The airport is now able to accept a greater number of flights and larger aircraft. It provides high standard installations to the traveler. The old terminal has been renovated in accordance with its original design. It was partly demolished and was expanded with a new glass-designed concourse and is now able to accommodate up to twenty-two aircraft.  The greater project was completed by December 2008. The airport currently has two terminals: Central and North.

La Aurora International Airport is the fourth-busiest airport in Central America in terms of passenger traffic, surpassed only by Tocumen International Airport in Panamá, Juan Santamaría International Airport in Costa Rica, and Monseñor Óscar Arnulfo Romero International Airport in El Salvador.

Overview 
La Aurora is being renovated, along with other airports in Guatemala, such as Mundo Maya International Airport, Quetzaltenango Airport, Puerto Barrios Airport, and San José Airport.

In July 2007, seven new gates were opened. These gates are equipped with jetway bridges and modern conveniences, also a new parking garage was also built and it can handle up to 500 vehicles.

There are brand new ticket counters. 2007 brought significant gate expansion (11 new gates were available starting December 2007). The airport now has two concourses. The northern concourse has 12 traditional gates and three remote gates. The central concourse, is used for larger aircraft as it provides 4–6 gates depending on the size of the aircraft.

The airport's runway currently measures . There have been efforts in the past to expand the runway but this has not yet been possible since there's a commercial area to the north of the runway and a small ravine near the southern side of the runway. Still, the renovation of the runway is in progress. The first phase consists in repaving the runway as well modernizing the illumination system. Future plans to expand the taxiway repave and move all the cargo facilities to San José Airport in Escuintla and Puerto Barrios Airport in Izabal. This will make room for more passenger terminal area and improved taxiways. Finally, the airport administration building is being refurbished and a regional terminal is being built.

La Aurora International Airport has two exclusive VIP lounges: Los Añejos Business Lounge and Copa Club, a VIP lounge for passengers traveling on Copa Airlines and United Airlines

Cargo operations are handled beside the passenger terminal building by COMBEX-IM or in the DHL hangars.

The head office of the Dirección General de Aeronáutica Civil is located in the airport Zone 13.

History of La Aurora

During World War II, the airport was used by the United States Army Air Forces Sixth Air Force defending the Central American coastline against Axis powers submarines. The first American personnel began arriving in December 1941; the airfield was improved and expanded by the United States' 805th Engineer Aviation Battalion in early 1942. During its period of American use, the military facilities of the airport were known as Guatemala City Air Base. Flying units assigned to the airport were:

 51st Fighter Squadron (Detachment) (32d Fighter Group), 2 January 1942 – 9 March 1943, (P-40 Warhawk)
 74th Bombardment Squadron (40th, 6th Bombardment Groups), 9 January 1942 – 7 April 1944 (B-18 Bolo, B-17 Flying Fortress)
 44th Bombardment Squadron (40th Bombardment Group) 6 July 1942 – 4 June 1943, (B-18 Bolo)

Detachments from the airfield operated intermittently from San Jose Airport, San José, Costa Rica, and Puerto San José, Guatemala from 1942 though 1944. After the war ended, a small number of Americans remained at the airport performing training duties with the Guatemalan Air Force and also operating a weather station (MATS 6th Weather Squadron). United States personnel were restricted to base during the Guatemalan revolution following the death of Colonel Francisco Xavier Arana on 18 July 1949. Some artillery shells landed on the base during the violence. The facility was closed on 28 July 1949 and turned over to Guatemalan authorities.

In October 2004, the Spanish carrier Iberia introduced nonstop service to Madrid aboard Airbus A340s. The new route resulted from the airline's decision to shut down its Miami hub, through which flights to Guatemala City used to operate.

The airport was closed for six months in 2020, from March to September, in response to the COVID-19 pandemic.

Airlines and destinations

Passenger

Cargo

Statistics

Passengers

Accidents and incidents
 On 1 March 1980, a Douglas C-47 of the Fuerza Aérea Guatemalteca was damaged beyond repair near La Aurora.
 On 6 April 1993, TACA Airlines Flight 510, a Boeing 767, ran off the end of Runway 19 (now Runway 20) after landing. A passenger on board filmed the landing, which showed a runway with standing water from a tropical storm which had just passed over. A great amount of runway had passed under the plane before touchdown and the pilot forced the landing. In spite of thrust reversers used, the plane could not slow down in time, began to shudder from excessive wheel-braking, the captain made a last second decision to steer the airplane to the left of the runway (avoiding a big ditch at the end of the runway), went down an embankment and stopped into some structures. Surprisingly, there were no fatalities and the only injured people were 3 non-passengers. The aircraft was written off.
On 28 April 1995, Faucett Flight 705, a Douglas DC-8 leased by Million Air, overshot the runway and crashed into several houses. All three crew members onboard survived, but 6 people on the ground were killed.
On 21 December 1999, Cubana de Aviación Flight 1216, a McDonnell Douglas DC-10-30 (leased to Cubana by AOM French Airlines) overshot runway 19 during landing and crashed into a residential area. 16 of the 314 people on board were killed, along with two people on the ground. 
 On 4 June 2018, the airport had to close due to the 2018 Volcán de Fuego eruption.

References

External links
 Dirección General de Aeronáutica Civil 

Airports in Guatemala
Airfields of the United States Army Air Forces
Guatemala Department
Buildings and structures in Guatemala City